Nannilam block is a revenue block in the Nannilam taluk of Tiruvarur district, Tamil Nadu, India. It has a total of 48 panchayat villages.

References 
 

Revenue blocks of Tiruvarur district